Joseph Fickler (1808–1865) was a German journalist.  A democrat by philosophy, Fickler became a leader of the Baden democratic movement.  In 1849, he became a member of the Baden revolutionary provisional government.  He died in 1865.

References

1808 births
1865 deaths
German journalists
German male journalists
19th-century German journalists
19th-century German male writers